Bebearia orientis, the eastern palm forester, is a butterfly in the family Nymphalidae. It is found in Somalia, Kenya, Tanzania, Mozambique, Malawi, Zambia and Zimbabwe. The habitat consists of forests.

Adults are attracted to fermented fruit. They are probably on wing year round.

The larvae feed on Phoenix reclinata, Raphia farinifera and probably Cocos nucifera.

Subspecies
B. o. orientis (southern Somalia, eastern Kenya, eastern Tanzania, eastern Zambia)
B. o. dealbata (Carcasson, 1958) (Kenya)
B. o. insularis Kielland, 1985 (Tanzania: Pemba Island)
B. o. malawiensis Holmes, 2001 (southern Malawi, Mozambique, northern and eastern Zimbabwe)
B. o. taveta Clifton, 1980 (Kenya)

References

Butterflies described in 1895
orientis
Butterflies of Africa